Transworld Snowboarding is a snowboarding video game developed by Housemarque and published by Infogrames, released in 2002, for the Xbox. It is a sequel to Supreme Snowboarding.

Gameplay
Transworld Snowboarding is a snowboard freestyle racing game. The game features ten professional snowboarders, including Todd Richards, Andrew Crawford, Tina Basich, Barrett Christy, and Peter Line.

Development
Transworld Snowboarding was developed by Housemarque.  It was renamed from Supreme Snowboarding 2 following a licensing shift as the publisher was moved from France to the United States and eventually became a moderate hit. It was first announced by Infogrames at E3 2001, along with Transworld Skateboarding and Transworld Surf.

The game was originally slated for release in the second quarter of 2002; it was released in the United States on October 15, with a European release on November 8 later that year.

Reception

Upon its release, Transworld Snowboarding received "average" reviews according to the review aggregation website Metacritic. It was nominated for "Best Extreme Sports Game" for IGN's Best of E3 2002.

References

External links

2002 video games
Atari games
Cancelled GameCube games
Housemarque games
Infogrames games
Single-player video games
Snowboarding video games
Video games developed in Finland
Xbox games
Xbox-only games